The 2006 California Insurance Commissioner election occurred on November 7, 2006. The primary elections took place on June 6, 2006. Businessman Steve Poizner, the Republican nominee, defeated Lieutenant Governor Cruz Bustamante, the Democratic nominee, for the office previously held by Democrat John Garamendi, who was term-limited and ran for lieutenant governor.  Poizner is the only Republican other than Governor Arnold Schwarzenegger to win a statewide election in California since 1998. As of 2022, this is the last time a Republican was elected Insurance Commissioner.

Primary Results
A bar graph of statewide results in this contest are available at https://web.archive.org/web/20070517094430/http://primary2006.ss.ca.gov/Returns/ins/00.htm.

Results by county are available here and here.

Democratic

Others

Results

Results by county
Results from the Secretary of State of California:

See also
2006 California elections
State of California
California Insurance Commissioner

References

External links
VoteCircle.com Non-partisan resources & vote sharing network for Californians
Information on the elections from California's Secretary of State 
Official Homepage of the California Department of Insurance

2006 California elections
California Insurance Commissioner elections
California